The Municipality of Solčava is a municipality in the traditional region of Upper Carniola in northern Slovenia. The seat of the municipality is the town of Solčava. Solčava became a municipality in 1998.

Settlements
In addition to the municipal seat of Solčava, the municipality also includes the settlements of Logarska Dolina, Podolševa, and Robanov Kot.

References

External links

Municipality of Solčava on Geopedia
Solčava municipal site

Solčava
1998 establishments in Slovenia